Federal elections were held in Switzerland on October 22, 1995. The Social Democratic Party emerged as the largest party in the National Council, winning 54 of the 200 seats.

Results

National Council

By constituency

Council of the States

References

1995 elections in Switzerland
Federal elections in Switzerland
October 1995 events in Europe